The Tower-palace of Guevara (Spanish: Torre-palacio de Guevara) is a tower-palace located in Barrundia, Spain. It was declared Bien de Interés Cultural in 1984.

References 

Buildings and structures in Álava
Bien de Interés Cultural landmarks in Álava